is a Japanese actor.

Iijima is represented by Oscar Promotion.

Biography
Iijima graduated from Sapporo Shiroshi Elementary School. He played basketball, and once part of a volleyball circle at Osaka High School . While working on a part-time job at an apparel store on 2015, Iijima won the Grand Prix at the 28th Junon Super Boy Contest and he is currently attending Ōtani University.

It was announced in August 2016 that he would play the lead role in the TV Asahi series Kamen Rider Ex-Aid that began airing of October of that year.

In August 2020, it was announced that lijima had tested positive for COVID-19.

Filmography

TV series

Films

Notes

References

External links
 

1996 births
Living people
Actors from Hokkaido
21st-century Japanese male actors
People from Sapporo